Jagannath Rural Municipality is the newly formed rural municipality in Bajura District in the Sudurpashchim Province of Nepal. It was formed in March 2017, when Government of Nepal decided to restrict all old administrative structure and announced 744 local level units in line with the Constitution of Nepal 2015.

History
It was formed by merging previous VDC named Gotre, and ward no 1 to 8 of Jagannath.
First it was named as PandavGufa rural municipality, later on the name was changed to Jagannath Rural municipality. 
It is the third smallest rural municipality in terms of population and area. It is divided into six wards and the headquarter of this newly formed municipality is at Juddi. It is unique in its unity in diversity.

Demographics
At the time of the 2011 Nepal census, Jagannath Rural Municipality had a population of 9,432. Of these, 99.7% spoke Nepali and 0.3% other languages as their first language.

In terms of ethnicity/caste, 43.1% were Chhetri, 16.6% Sarki, 13.4% Thakuri, 10.8% Damai/Dholi, 5.5% Sanyasi/Dasnami, 5.2% Kami, 3.9% Lohar, 0.9% Hill Brahmin, 0.2% Dhanuk, 0.1% Tharu and 0.2% others.

In terms of religion, 99.7% were Hindu and 0.3% Christian.

References

Bajura District
Rural municipalities of Nepal established in 2017
Rural municipalities in Bajura District